Job 20 is the twentieth chapter of the Book of Job in the Hebrew Bible or the Old Testament of the Christian Bible. The book is anonymous; most scholars believe it was written around 6th century BCE. This chapter records the speech of Zophar the Naamathite (one of Job's friends), which belongs to the Dialogue section of the book, comprising Job 3:1–31:40.

Text
The original text is written in Hebrew language. This chapter is divided into 29 verses.

Textual witnesses
Some early manuscripts containing the text of this chapter in Hebrew are of the Masoretic Text, which includes the Aleppo Codex (10th century), and Codex Leningradensis (1008).

There is also a translation into Koine Greek known as the Septuagint, made in the last few centuries BC; some extant ancient manuscripts of this version include Codex Vaticanus (B; B; 4th century), Codex Sinaiticus (S; BHK: S; 4th century), and Codex Alexandrinus (A; A; 5th century).

Analysis
The structure of the book is as follows:
The Prologue (chapters 1–2)
The Dialogue (chapters 3–31)
The Verdicts (32:1–42:6)
The Epilogue (42:7–17)

Within the structure, chapter 20 is grouped into the Dialogue section with the following outline:
Job's Self-Curse and Self-Lament (3:1–26)
Round One (4:1–14:22)
Round Two (15:1–21:34)
Eliphaz (15:1–35)
Job (16:1–17:16)
Bildad (18:1–21)
Job (19:1–29)
Zophar (20:1–29)
Zohar's Initial Response (20:1–3)
The Premature Death of the Wicked (20:4–11)
Sin Will Destroy (20:12–22)
How God Deals with the Wicked (20:23–29)
Job (21:1–34)
Round Three (22:1–27:23)
Interlude – A Poem on Wisdom (28:1–28)
Job's Summing Up (29:1–31:40)

The Dialogue section is composed in the format of poetry with distinctive syntax and grammar. 

Chapter 20 contains Zophar's second (and final) speech, which can be divided into several parts:
Zophar's initial response (verses 1–3)
The brevity of the wicked due to premature death (verses 4–11)
The self-destructive nature of sin (using distinctive food imagery, verses 12–22)
God's active wrath against the wicked (verses 23–29)

Zophar's initial response (20:1–3)
In the opening part of the chapter, Zophar responds to Job's rebuke to the three friends (Job 19:28–29) with increasing impatience and growing "troubled thoughts" he felt as he listens to Job. Zophar claims that a "spirit from/out of his understandings answers me" (verse 3b) which prompts him to reply.

Verse 3
[Zophar said:] "I have heard the rebuke that reproaches me,
And the spirit of my understanding causes me to answer."
"Rebuke (that reproaches me)": literally "of my insulting correction" (cf. Job 19:3).
"The spirit of my understanding": translated from the Hebrew phrase , ruakh mibbinati, literally "a spirit/wind/breath/impulse from my understanding".
These words (and also the opening statements of other friends of Job) tends to reveal that Job's friends seem more concerned about their wounded pride than about Job's grievous suffering.

Zophar's explanation that the  wicked will not escape God's wrath (20:4–29)
Zophar states his resolutely fixed position of the retribution theology in this final speech (Zophar would not participate in the third round of debate), which he focuses mainly at the 'negative side of the equation': 'God always destroys the wicked'. Like Bildad in the first round and Eliphaz in the second round (Job 15) Zophar appeals to tradition, but in a more hyperbolic way to emphasize his certainty of his stance. Two themes are emphasized:
 the shortness of time for the wicked to prevail
 the certainty of death for the wicked.
Zophar's traditional understanding weighs more that wickedness will reap desctructive consequences (verses14, 16, 18–19, 21; 'self desctructive nature of human evil') than the involvement of God, despite the belief that God is still working behind it. At the end, God will also show the active wrath against the wicked, as an 'inheritance' allotted to those people (verse 29).

Verse 29
[Zophar said:] "This is the wicked man’s portion from God,
and the inheritance appointed to him by God."
"Appointed to him": translated from the Hebrew word , ʾimro, which can be rendered as "his appointment" or "his word”; in combination with the word "inheritance" it can be translated as "his appointed heritage".

See also

Related Bible parts: Job 19, Job 42

References

Sources

External links
 Jewish translations:
 Iyov - Job - Chapter 20 (Judaica Press) translation [with Rashi's commentary] at Chabad.org
 Christian translations:
 Online Bible at GospelHall.org (ESV, KJV, Darby, American Standard Version, Bible in Basic English)
 Book of Job Chapter 20. Various versions
  Various versions

20